Whatcom may refer to Whatcom County, Washington, USA, or to several places and entities therein:

 Lake Whatcom
 Whatcom Creek drains Lake Whatcom into Bellingham Bay
 Whatcom Falls Park, Bellingham, containing the upper part of Whatcom Creek
 Whatcom Peak, North Cascades National Park
 Whatcom Glacier, North Cascades National Park
 Whatcom Trail, a gold prospectors' trail from Bellingham Bay to the upper Fraser Valley
 Whatcom, a settlement incorporated into Bellingham, Washington in 1903
 Whatcom County Council
 Whatcom Community College, Bellingham
 Whatcom Middle School, Bellingham School District

See also

 New Whatcom, one of the towns in Whatcom County that merged to form Bellingham, Washington
 New Whatcom Normal School, former name of Western Washington University